Himmelskibet, Excelsior / A Trip to Mars / Das Himmelschiff is a 1918 Danish film about a trip to Mars. In 2006, the film was restored and re-released on DVD by the Danish Film Institute.

Phil Hardy says it is "the film that marked the beginning of the space opera subgenre of science fiction," but notes that Denmark did not make another science fiction film until Reptilicus in 1961.

Cast 
Gunnar Tolnæs as Avanti Planetaros - Captain of the Space Ship
Zanny Petersen as Corona, Avanti's Sister
Nicolai Neiiendam as Professor Planetaros, Astronomer
Alf Blütecher as Dr. Krafft, Avanti's Friend
Svend Kornbeck as David Dane, American
Philip Bech as Martian leader - Wise Man
Lilly Jacobson as Marya, Martian Leader's Daughter
Frederik Jacobsen as Professor Dubius

Production crew
Production Design by Carlo Jacobsen
Art Direction by Axel Bruun

See also

List of films set on Mars
Human mission to Mars

References

External links

Himmelskibet on YouTube
Plot summary

Programme in Danish with pictures 
Himmelskibet

1918 films
1910s science fiction films
Danish black-and-white films
Danish science fiction films
Danish silent films
Films about extraterrestrial life
Mars in film
Films directed by Holger-Madsen
Silent science fiction films